Union University is a federation of several graduate and undergraduate institutions which are located in New York State, United States.  Its constituent entities include Albany College of Pharmacy, Albany Law School, Albany Medical College, Dudley Observatory, Union Graduate College, and Union College. It was established in 1873. The motto on its seal is In necessariis unitas, in dubiis libertas, in omnibus caritas (English: Unity in necessary matters, freedom in doubtful matters, charity toward all). Each member institution has its own governing board, is fiscally independent, and is responsible for its own programs.

See also
Wilmer Ingalls Gordon

References

 
Educational institutions established in 1873
1873 establishments in New York (state)